A Poincaré plot, named after Henri Poincaré, is a type of recurrence plot used to quantify self-similarity in processes, usually periodic functions.  It is also known as a return map. Poincaré plots can be used to distinguish  chaos from randomness by embedding a data set in a higher-dimensional state space.

Given a time series of the form

 

a return map in its simplest form first plots (xt, xt+1), then plots (xt+1, xt+2), then (xt+2, xt+3), and so on.

Applications in electrocardiography
An electrocardiogram (ECG) is a tracing of the voltage changes in the chest generated by the heart, whose contraction in a normal person is triggered by an electrical impulse that originates in the sinoatrial node. The ECG normally consists of a series of waves, labeled the P, Q, R, S and T waves. The P wave represents depolarization of the atria, the Q-R-S series of waves depolarization of the ventricles and the T wave repolarization of the ventricles. The interval between two successive R waves (the RR interval) is a measure of the heart rate.

The heart rate normally varies slightly: during a deep breath, it speeds up and during a deep exhalation, it slows down. (The RR interval will shorten when the heart speeds up, and lengthen when it slows.) An RR tachograph is a graph of the numerical value of the RR-interval versus time. 

In the context of RR tachography, a Poincaré plot is a graph of RR(n) on the x-axis versus RR(n + 1) (the succeeding RR interval) on the y-axis, i.e. one takes a sequence of intervals and plots each interval against the following interval.
The recurrence plot is used as a standard visualizing technique to detect the presence of oscillations in non-linear dynamic systems. In the context of electrocardiography, the rate of the healthy heart is normally tightly controlled by the body's regulatory mechanisms (specifically, by the autonomic nervous system). Several research papers demonstrate the potential of ECG signal-based Poincaré plots in detecting heart-related diseases or abnormalities.

See also
 Recurrence plot
 Poincaré map
 Heart rate variability (HRV), a use of Poincaré plots to assess heart functionality.
 PhysioNet tool for constructing multi-scale Poincaré plots from a heartbeat time series.

References

Scaling symmetries
Dynamical systems
Chaos theory
Statistical charts and diagrams
Plot